Jacquet Island was a phantom island charted at approximately  in the North Atlantic, just to the east of the Flemish Cap. Belief in its existence continued into the 19th century, when it was discussed by cartographers as a possible midway point for the transatlantic telegraph cable. John Scott of the Seaflower reported seeing it in 1836.

References

Phantom islands of the Atlantic
Islands of the North Atlantic Ocean